List of shoals of Oregon contains all natural river bars, sandbars, spits, and shoals identified by the USGS in the U.S. state of Oregon.  The USGS defines a bar as a "natural accumulation of sand, gravel, or alluvium forming an underwater or exposed embankment (ledge, reef, sandbar, shoal, spit)".

Perhaps the best known is the Columbia Bar system which consists of several bars, including Peacock Spit and Clatsop Spit outside the jetties.  Inside, in the Columbia River proper are Jetty Sands, Desdemona Sands, Baker Sands, Chinook Sands, Youngs River Sands, and Tongue Point Bar all near the mouth.

There are 156 bars listed as of December 12, 2008.

See also
 Lists of Oregon-related topics

References 

Shoals
Oregon